William Campbell Preston Breckinridge (August 28, 1837 – November 18, 1904) was a lawyer and Democratic politician from Kentucky; a U.S. Representative from 1885 to 1895. He was a scion of the Breckinridge political family: grandson of Senator John Breckinridge, and first cousin of Vice President John C. Breckinridge.

Biography

Early life and education 
William Breckinridge was born in Baltimore, Maryland, the son of Robert Jefferson Breckinridge, a prominent Kentucky minister, educator, and Unionist politician. His mother was the former Ann Sophronisba Preston. He was largely raised in Pennsylvania where his father was president of Jefferson College.

Breckinridge graduated from Centre College in Danville, Kentucky, in 1855. He then studied to be a medical doctor for a year but then switched to studying law. He earned his Juris Doctor from the University of Louisville in 1857. He returned to Lexington, Kentucky, to engage in the practice of law. In this time he married Lucretia Clay a granddaughter of Henry Clay. She died in 1860.

Civil War 

Despite his father's Unionist position (the elder Breckinridge supported the election of Lincoln), William entered the Confederate States Army in 1861, and was commissioned as a Captain. He served in the cavalry under John Hunt Morgan. By the end of the war, he was Colonel of the 9th Kentucky Cavalry. He also served as a bodyguard to Jefferson Davis during his flight from Richmond.

Following the war, he returned to Lexington, Kentucky where he resumed the practice of law and taught jurisprudence at the University of Kentucky.

Post-Civil War 
From 1866 to 1868, he also served as the editor of the Lexington Observer and Reporter. In 1869 Breckinridge ran unsuccessfully for county attorney losing in large part because he was in favor of allowing African-Americans to testify in the courts. He was elected to the United States House of Representatives in 1884 as a Democrat and was re-elected four times, serving from 1885 to 1895.

He had in later years married Issa Desha. After her death in 1892, he married Louse Wing.

In 1890, he became a charter member of the District of Columbia Society of the Sons of the American Revolution. He was a Mason, and a member of the Masonic Knights Templar.

In 1893, Madeleine V. Pollard filed suit against Breckinridge for breach of promise for his failure to marry her as promised. The trial was a national sensation; the revelations of Breckinridge's infidelity and his weak defense of the breach of promise charge led to the loss of the lawsuit and contributed to the end of his political career.

In 1896, he ran for congress on a strong currency fusion ticket but was defeated. After this, he was hired by the Lexington Morning Herald as their chief editorial writer.

At the November 1901 Convention of the State Federation of Labor in Lexington, Breckinridge delivered an eloquent speech in which he extolled the virtues of a six-day work week, opposed violent strikes, and encouraged negotiations. The following day, the vice president of the group, James D. Wood, took over the convention and helped pass resolutions which called Breckinridge an "enemy of the trade and labor organizations of the state."  The controversy which followed split the federation's membership.

Support of racial equality
After the Civil War, William Breckinridge renounced the views that had led him to fight for the Confederacy and became an advocate of racial equality.

The sooner Americans rid themselves of cruel racists in their midst, he said, "the sooner they will realize that their institutions are in no danger, their civilization is not at stake, and that their permanent and practical undisputed sway can not be overturned." He opposed literacy tests and other means of black disfranchisement in the hopes that some day, "all races might enjoy a common liberty secured by an imperial law."

As editor of the Observer and Reporter in 1866–1868, he advocated the repeal of the restrictions on Negro testimony. Breckinridge and other "New Departure" men believed that admitting blacks to full civil rights, including the right to testify against whites, was a prerequisite for progress. Unusually, they proposed to accomplish this through the Democratic Party, which at this time was for white supremacy.

As an attorney, he represented blacks in court. When a Franklin County black man was convicted of murdering a prominent citizen who had led a mob to seize him, Breckinridge fought to obtain a pardon. In 1869, Breckinridge ran for state's attorney in Boyle County, and the testimony question was the central issue of his campaign. He intended to admit black testimony in all cases and upheld Fayette County as an example that should be followed by the whole state.

As a U.S. Representative, Breckinridge had asked the commissioner of labor to retain a black Census Office worker who feared that he would be fired because of race.

He expressed admiration for both Booker T. Washington and W. E. B. DuBois. Comparing Booker T. Washington's Up From Slavery with DuBois' The Souls of Black Folk, he called both books "remarkable contributions" to literature and termed Souls "the most significant and remarkable utterance yet published by a negro." He recommended both books and both men to his readers.

A young black lawyer offered aid to Breckinridge during his 1894 problems, noting that he had helped many "young colored men" in their law careers. Breckinridge predicted a better day for race relations: "Barriers will be removed, prejudices will die, class distinctions be obliterated. Not at once, not in our day; not without fierce contest; not without heroism and sacrifice, but yet slowly, surely, the day grows stronger; the sun rises higher toward the better noon and the glad twilight." Echoing his father, he wrote: "The negro is a man and the race in its essential unity is one race. Of one blood were all men made."

Family and death

In 1859, Breckinridge married Lucia Clay. In 1861, he married Issa Desha; they were the parents of Sophonisba Breckinridge, Desha Breckinridge, and Robert Jefferson Breckinridge. In 1893, he married Louise Scott Wing. In 1893, Madeleine Pollard brought suit for breach of promise for his failure to make good on a promise of marriage. Breckinridge lost the ensuing court battle and shortly thereafter, failed to win reelection to Congress.

Breckinridge died November 18, 1904, and is interred in Lexington Cemetery.

See also
 Breckinridge family in the American Civil War
 Kentucky in the American Civil War
 List of federal political sex scandals in the United States

References

Further reading

External links

"Colonel William (Willie) Campbell Preston Breckinridge – 9th Kentucky Cavalry, C.S." — Article by Civil War historian/author Bryan S. Bush
Hon. Wm. C. P. Breckinridge, of Kentucky, "The Race Question" ''The Arena, Vol. 2 (June–November 1890), pp. 39–56
Breckinridge Biographies 1 at www.breckinridge.com
The Political Graveyard: Index to Politicians: Breckinridge at politicalgraveyard.com
"The Personal Freedom of the Individual" — Breckinridge's Speech at the State Federation of Labor Convention

1837 births
1904 deaths
Centre College alumni
Kentucky lawyers
People of Kentucky in the American Civil War
University of Louisville School of Law alumni
Breckinridge family
American people of English descent
Democratic Party members of the United States House of Representatives from Kentucky
19th-century American politicians